The action of 3 March 2009 took place when the German   chased and captured a pirate skiff in the Gulf of Aden, after the persons on board the small vessel fired at and attempted to stop the German-owned tanker MV Courier. The operation marked the first time that the German Navy captured a hostile vessel at sea since World War II.

Background
On 19 December 2008, the German parliament – the Bundestag – gave the green light for German participation in Operation Atalanta. The German Navy mission would be to escort the merchant ships involved in the World Food Programme, and under certain circumstances, prevent piracy activities against commercial shipping in the operational area. The deployment of the German Navy bore some criticism from navy officers, who deemed the mission of searching for small fiberglass craft in an area nine times the size of Germany as "damned hard work".

On 22 January 2009, the frigate , under the command of Markus Rehbein, relieved her sister ship  on her patrol station around the Horn of Africa.

Action
On 3 March at 7:12 local time, the 14,969 ton Antigua and Barbuda-registered container ship MV Courier, owned by a Bremen-based shipping company and manned by a Filipino crew, sent a distress message reporting the attack of pirates on board a small vessel. The assailants fired rocket-propelled grenades and automatic rifles at the freighter. The German warship dispatched her Westland Lynx helicopter to the scene, which opened warning shots at the hostile launch. The Lynx was joined by a Sikorsky SH-60 Seahawk from the American guided missile cruiser .

A couple of hours later, the pirate skiff was intercepted by the German frigate and seized by German marines, who captured nine suspects. The German boarding party found a cache of one rocket launcher, three AK-47 rifles, a Tokarev pistol, a carbine and an automatic rifle. All these weapons were thrown overboard by the Germans, for "security reasons", according to German Defence Minister Franz Josef Jung. Some of the attackers came from Sudan. This was the first time that the German Navy seized a hostile vessel and her crew at sea since World War II.

Aftermath
The nine suspects were handed over to Kenyan authorities on 10 March 2009, in accordance with an agreement reached between the European Union and Kenya just four days before. The Kenyan high court questioned the procedures, on the basis that key evidence was unintentionally destroyed by the German Navy when the arms were disposed of. The nine men were eventually released by a Kenyan court on 9 November 2010.

Notes

References
 First Arrests: German Navy Detains 9 Pirate Suspects
 German Marines Foil Pirate Attack on Bremen-Based Ship Off Somalia

Conflicts in 2009
Maritime incidents in 2009
2009 in Somalia
Naval battles of Operation Enduring Freedom
Naval battles post-1945
2009 in Germany
Piracy in Somalia
Naval battles involving Germany
Naval battles involving pirates
Naval battles involving the United States
March 2009 events in Africa
Gulf of Aden
Operation Atalanta
Battles and conflicts without fatalities